Chahardangeh Rural District is in the Central District of Chaharbagh County, Alborz province, Iran. It was formerly in Chaharbagh District of Savojbolagh County, Tehran province. At the census of 2006, its population was 38,598 in 9,638 households, and in the most recent census of 2016, it had decreased to 5,233 in 1,703 households, by which time Savojbolagh County had become a part of the newly established Alborz province. The largest of its 23 villages was Arababad-e Khosravi, with 1,869 people.

References 

Rural Districts of Alborz Province

Populated places in Alborz Province